Omm ol Khassa-ye Olya (also Romanized as Omm ol Khas̄s̄á-ye ‘Olyā; also known as Omm Khos̄ī-ye ‘Olyā, Omm ol Khes̄ey, Omm ol Khes̄ey-ye Do, Omm ol Khes̄ey-ye ‘Olyā, and Omm oţ Ţarfeh-ye Bālā) is a village in Abdoliyeh-ye Gharbi Rural District, in the Central District of Ramshir County, Khuzestan Province, Iran. At the 2006 census, its population was 26, in 6 families.

References 

Populated places in Ramshir County